Christopher Murray is an American physician, health economist, and global health researcher. He is a professor at the University of Washington in Seattle, where he is Chair of Health Metrics Science and the director of the Institute for Health Metrics and Evaluation (IHME).

Beginning in 1990, he has worked on ways to measure the burden of disease and disability around the globe. He has led several projects to gather that data, disease-by-disease, country by country. The aim of these efforts, which involves the work of hundreds of researchers, is to provide data for policy makers around the world to allocate healthcare resources.

Early life
Murray was born to a New Zealand-born scientist father and grew up in Minnesota with three siblings, including Megan B. Murray. As his father was an internist and mother was a microbiologist, the family moved to Niger for various charitable medical missions.

Career
Murray previously served as Director of the Harvard Initiative for Global Health and as Executive Director of the Evidence and Information for Policy Cluster at the World Health Organization. He graduated from Harvard University in 1984 and was a Rhodes Scholar, attending Oxford University, where he earned a DPhil in International Health Economics.  In 1988, he returned to Harvard, where he specialized in internal medicine and earned a Medical Doctorate. Since, he has worked on measurement of health and health outcomes. He was a part of the Disease Control Priorities Project. From 2005-2007, Murray was director of the Harvard Center for Population and Development Studies.

In 2007, Murray moved from Harvard to the University of Washington to head the Institute for Health Metrics and Evaluation with the help of former Mexican Secretary of Health, Julio Frenk, who serves as Chair of the Board of Directors. At the institute, Murray's work has included studying adult and child mortality, costs of various health interventions, and continuing work with colleagues at Harvard, the WHO and elsewhere on projects that conduct research and mine data to improve public health.

The Institute for Health Metrics and Evaluation COVID model was called the Chris Murray model in White House press briefings.

In 2020, Murray was appointed by the Council on Foreign Relations to serve on its Independent Task Force on Improving Pandemic Preparedness, co-chaired by Sylvia Mathews Burwell and Frances Fragos Townsend.

Research
While at Harvard, Murray, along with medical demographer Alan Lopez, developed the disability adjusted life years (DALY) approach to measuring the global burden of disease. Using this approach, it is possible to calculate standardized estimates for the years of healthy life lost due to disease, injury and risk factors over time. It is also possible to compare the effects of different diseases on a population. The research is intended to be used by policy makers to weigh healthcare decisions and allocate resources.

The idea behind the work was to remove politics and other pressures from the research questions. This led to some tension when the team moved to the World Health Organization. When countries and organizations were found to have poorer-than-expected health outcomes, they complained to the W.H.O. At one point, an independent committee was formed to review some of the results.

His work attracted the attention of Bill Gates, who decided to use the concept of DALYs to help determine priorities and evaluate potential projects in global health. In 2007, the Bill & Melinda Gates Foundation, along with the state of Washington, established IHME and selected Murray as its leader.  As head of IHME, Murray greatly expanded on his earlier research, leading an effort by 486 researchers from 302 institutions in 50 countries to produce Global Burden of Disease reports in 2010 and 2013.

The later reports were significantly larger than the first. In 1990, for example, researchers catalogued 107 diseases and injuries. The 2013 report involved creating and then analyzing a database of over 800 million deaths, and produced estimates for death and disability from 240 health conditions.

Some of the findings from his studies have been controversial. In 2010, The Lancet published one such study on global maternal death rates, showing, to the surprise of some in the field, that maternal mortality had dropped significantly over the prior three decades. Fearing the results might undermine their ongoing efforts, some advocacy groups tried to delay publication of the material, The Lancet editor said at the time.

In 2008, The Lancet published findings from Murray and IHME's work evaluating the work of Gavi, the vaccine alliance, which showed many countries had been inflating the number of children being immunized for diphtheria, pertussis, and tetanus. The study found that progress in childhood immunizations is far lower than prior official reports. The countries were receiving funding for the vaccinations, raising the concern that Gavi may have paid out much more than it should have based on the number of children immunized. After the report was published Gavi suspended payments and commenced a review.

References

External links
 IHME biography
 Harvard School of Public Health biography

American Rhodes Scholars
American demographers
American public health doctors
Development specialists
Harvard Medical School alumni
Health economists
Living people
Year of birth missing (living people)
University of Washington faculty
Members of the National Academy of Medicine